Angling in Yellowstone National Park is a major reason many visitors come to the park each year and since it was created in 1872, the park has drawn anglers from around the world to fish its waters.  In 2006, over 50,000 park fishing permits were issued to visitors. The park contains hundreds of miles of accessible, high-quality trout rivers containing wild trout populations—over 200 creeks, streams and rivers are fishable.  There are 45 fishable lakes and several large lakes are easily accessible to visitors.  Additionally, the park's remote sections provide anglers ample opportunity to visit rivers, streams, creeks and lakes that receive little angling pressure.  With the exception of one specially designated drainage, all the park's waters are restricted to artificial lures and fly fishing.  The Madison, Firehole and a section of the Gibbon rivers are restricted to fly fishing only.

Anglers visiting the park to fish will encounter westslope cutthroat, Yellowstone cutthroat, rainbow, brown, brook and lake trout, mountain whitefish and Arctic grayling.  The park's fishing season runs from the Saturday in May associated with Memorial Day to the first Sunday in November each year.  The National Park Service regulates angling in the park and classifies different fish available to the angler as either native or non-native species.  Any native species—cutthroat trout, grayling and whitefish—caught must be immediately released unharmed.  Non-natives—rainbow, brown, brook and lake trout have different bag limits depending on the waters fished.  Some non-natives are also subject to catch and release regulations and all lake trout caught in Yellowstone Lake or river must be killed.  All hooks used in the park must be barbless or have their barbs pinched down.  Many specific waters or sections of waters are closed either permanently for either safety reasons, wildlife management or to protect thermal features.  The National Park Service may also enact emergency closures and restrictions because of low water, high temperatures or fires.

Anglers should always be familiar with the most current regulations, restrictions and closures.  A Yellowstone National Park fishing permit is required to fish in the park.  State licenses are not required.

Angling supplies are available in the park's concession stores and in the towns associated with major entrances to the park—West Yellowstone, Montana; Gardiner, Montana; Jackson, Wyoming; Cody, Wyoming and Cooke City, Montana

History

The original expeditions that explored the regions that ultimately became Yellowstone National Park in 1872 caught fish in many of its waters to supply themselves with fresh provisions.  It wasn't long after the creation of the park, that park officials understood the importance of angling to visitors and the importance of creating a ready resource to supply hotels and camps within the park with fresh fish.  This resulted in the first government stocking of native and non-native species in 1889 and continued with a variety of successful and unsuccessful stocking efforts until 1955 when all stocking programs in the park were discontinued.  Today's park trout are completely wild populations.  Many of the park's waters held no fish prior to government stocking operations which introduced mainly non-native species to the rivers and lakes and redistributed native species.  In fact, with the exception of the upper Yellowstone River drainage, all the lakes and streams above major waterfalls were devoid of game fish prior to government stocking operations.

Probably the most dramatic example of this is the Firehole River above Firehole Falls. When the Washburn-Langford-Doane Expedition camped on the shores of the upper Firehole in the fall of 1870, the river was barren of trout. The same was true of the Gibbon River and Gibbon Falls. Today, the upper Firehole is one of the premier angling destinations in North America.
One of the earliest accounts of trout fishing in the park is from Mary Trowbridge Townsend's 1897 article in Outing Magazine A Woman's Trout Fishing in Yellowstone Park in which she talks about catching the Von Behr trout in the Fire Hole [sic] river.

In the early days of government stocking operations, all types of attempts were made to introduce desirable species for the angler.  In the case of Yellowstone, both landlocked Atlantic salmon and largemouth bass were introduced but never established themselves in the park. Yellow perch were inadvertently introduced, established themselves in a few lakes, and were later poisoned out.  By the early 20th century, a number of hatcheries were established in the park by the U.S. Bureau of Fisheries.  These hatcheries not only produced stocks for the park, but also took advantage of the great spawning stock of cutthroat trout to supply eggs to hatcheries around the U.S.  Between 1901 and 1953, 818 million trout eggs were exported from the park to hatcheries throughout the U.S.

The hatcheries and stocking operations had both positive and negative impacts on the quality of angling in Yellowstone National Park in the first half of the 20th century.  Many native populations were displaced by non-natives, but there was quality brown and rainbow trout fishing in the Firehole, Madison and Gibbon river drainages.  Stocking and hatchery operations had had an overall negative impact on the Yellowstone cutthroat and Westslope cutthroat populations and in 1953 the National Park Service began closing the hatcheries and stopping stocking operations.  The last fish stocked for the benefit of anglers was in 1955 after some 310 million fish had been released in park waters since 1889.

The regulation of anglers in the park also evolved significantly since the park's creation.  Original angling was a subsistence affair to fill a camp's larder and feed visitors to the park.  Although fishing methods were limited to hook and line early in the park's history, there were no limits. In the 1920s, a daily limit of 20 fish was set.  This was reduced to 10, then five and then three in 1954.  Limits have fluctuated based on waters and species ever since then.  Until 1969, bait could be used in most waters. In 1950, the Madison and Firehole rivers were designated as "Fly Fishing Only". The lower Gibbon River was given that designation in 1968.  In 1970, regulation turned to minimum size limits for cutthroat trout and there began an era where the emphasis of regulation became the protection of native species.  Angling permits were free in the park until 1994, when a $10 fee was charged for a seven-day permit. In 2013, the National Park Service began allowing unlimited taking of non-native species in some waters and required mandatory killing of rainbow and brook trout caught in the Lamar River drainage to protect native cutthroat trout.

Outfitters and writers

Yellowstone National Park and its rivers and lakes have always been a mecca for serious fishermen, especially fly fishermen.  The literature and popular press of the sport has extensive references to fishing adventures in park waters.  Many of the serious writers in the sport used park waters to test, prove and write about new techniques, equipment and fly patterns. The great angling in the park spawned outfitters in the towns outside the park such as West Yellowstone, Livingston, Gardiner and Jackson.

In 1936 and 1937, a British businessman and fly fisherman who emigrated to New York in 1930 by the name of Howard Back visited the park and compiled the first real assessment of the various waters and what the fly fisherman could expect from them.  In his The Waters of the Yellowstone with Rod and Fly (1938), Back described his fishing experiences on what he called the Four Rivers which include the Madison, Firehole and Gibbon rivers, as well as the Yellowstone River.  Prior to Back's work, the only available serious reference for anglers was a 1921 Bureau of Fisheries publication entitled The Fishes of the Yellowstone National Park—With Description of Park Waters and Notes on Fishing, a publication that Back encouraged all prospective anglers visiting Yellowstone to read,
Although Dan Bailey guided and serviced fly fisherman throughout South Central Montana, much of his business was guiding and outfitting fishermen in Yellowstone National Park. Dan Bailey's Fly Shop is still in business today servicing anglers visiting Yellowstone.

Although West Yellowstone had become the major tourist entrance to the park since the Oregon Short Line began operations in 1907, the establishment of serious fly fishing outfitters in West Yellowstone didn't occur until the mid-1930s when Don Martinez, the fly tier who popularized the Woolly Worm, opened a seasonal, one-room fly shop. In 1947, a fly fisherman and tier who worked for Martinez, Pat Barnes, opened a full-time fly shop, which today is Bob Jacklin's Fly Shop on the corner of Yellowstone and Canyon streets. The real landmark came in 1952 when a young man from Manhattan, Montana by the name of Bud Lilly opened Bud Lilly's Trout Shop on the corner of Madison and Canyon Streets (formerly Don Martinez's Tackle Shop).  Lilly guided anglers, taught fly casting and outfitted anglers in Yellowstone for 35 years and did more than anyone else in the 1950–70s to promote fly fishing and fisheries conservation in Yellowstone throughout North America.  Many of the great post-WWII era anglers first came to Yellowstone and the West because of Bud Lilly's Trout Shop and his writings.

Gardiner, Montana, although not the size or draw of West Yellowstone, got its own local fly fishing shop in 1953 when Merton J. Parks opened Parks' Fly Shop.  Still operating today and run by his son, Richard Parks, Parks' Fly Shop and its guides have contributed significantly to the angling history of the park with the publication of Fishing Yellowstone National Park—An Angler's Complete Guide to More than 100 streams, rivers and lakes (1998).

Many well-known angling authors have written about their experiences in Yellowstone National Park.  Howard Back was the first, but many influential anglers used Yellowstone as a backdrop for their angling stories, adventures and technical work.

Ray Bergman, the angling editor of Outdoor Life magazine, was a fan of the Firehole River and gave it many pages of coverage in his work Trout (1938, 1952). Here's a typical passage describing his fishing experiences in the Midway Geyser Basin section of the Firehole:

Charles Brooks was a trout fishing technician whose works Larger Trout for the Western Fly Fisherman (1970), The Trout and the Stream (1974) and Nymph Fishing for Larger Trout (1976) were largely based on research and fishing experiences in Yellowstone and adjacent waters. Brooks was a retired Air Force officer who settled in West Yellowstone in 1961 and began a quest to understand the entomology of Yellowstone's rivers, especially the imitation and presentation of nymphs.  Brooks immortalized the Madison River as an angling icon in his The Living River—A Fisherman's Intimate Profile Of The Madison River Watershed—Its History, Ecology, Lore, and Angling Opportunities (1979).
One cannot own a river or even part of it, except in one's heart. But if affection, pride, knowledge, and experience for and about a river counts for anything, the part of the Madison River in Yellowstone Park belongs to me.  It also belongs to 220 million other Americans, but few know and love it as I do.

Fly fishing in Yellowstone

Today, Yellowstone National Park is a fly fishing destination.  Although artificial lures are allowed in some waters, most anglers, especially in the rivers and streams are fly fishermen.  The accessible, insect rich rivers and streams provide reliable hatches and allow both novice and accomplished anglers alike a wide variety of opportunities for both technical and easy dry fly, wet fly, nymph or streamer fly fishing. There are nearly 50 outfitters in Montana, Wyoming, and Idaho licensed to provide guided fly fishing experiences in the park and operate fly shops outside the park.

Major rivers

Major lakes

Minor streams, creeks and lakes

Regulations

Anglers are provided the latest park fishing regulations when they acquire their park fishing permit which can be obtained at all entrance stations and park concessionaires inside and outside the park. The 2021 season fishing regulations are summarized as follows:

See also
Fishes of Yellowstone National Park

References

Further reading
 
 
 
 
 
 

 
 
 
 
 
 

Yellowstone National Park
Fishing in the United States